Dicle Dam is one of the 21 dams of the Southeastern Anatolia Project of Turkey. These facilities are located within the provincial territory of Diyarbakır, at a distance of 50 kilometres to Diyarbakır city centre. More specifically, the dam and the hydroelectric power plant are located in Eğil district, at a distance of 800 metres from the point of junction of the streams of Maden Stream and Dibni to form the Tigris, and 22 kilometres downstream of the Kralkızı Dam. Construction works were started in 1986 and the dam was completed in 1997. The dam has an installed hydroelectric capacity of 110 MW and is designed to ultimately irrigate 128,080 hectares. In 2001 a water transmission line and a water treatment plant were commissioned that provided about 85% of the drinking water for the city of Diyarbakir in 2010. In 2018 a gate of the dam broke the water lever decreased and a part of a village re-emerged in the Eğil district.

References

 
 GAP Regional Development Administration - Impounding started at Kralkızı and Dicle Dams
 www.un.org.tr/undp/Gap.htm - United Nations  Southeast Anatolia Sustainable Human Development Program (GAP) 
 www.ecgd.gov.uk Data sheet

External links

 www.gap.gov.tr - Official GAP web site

Dams in Diyarbakır Province
Hydroelectric power stations in Turkey
Southeastern Anatolia Project
Dams completed in 1997
Rock-filled dams
Dams on the Tigris River